Ferrières is a former commune in the Manche department in north-western France. On 1 January 2016, it was merged into the commune of Le Teilleul.

See also
Communes of the Manche department

References 

Former communes of Manche